Krister Andersson (born 3 May 1951 in Eskilstuna, Sweden) is a Swedish musician (tenor saxophone, alt saxophone and clarinet) and composer.

Career 
Anderson started his professional career at the age of 16 as a clarinetist in a military band, and at the same time played saxophone in dance bands. He was originally trained in classical music as a clarinet soloist at Kungliga Musikhögskolan (Royal College of Music) in Stockholm. During the early part of the 1970s, he starred as clarinet soloist in the Jeunesses Musicales World Orchestra, led by the conductor Leonard Bernstein. Later, he was influenced by Bernt Rosengren, John Coltrane and Joe Henderson, and he turned to jazz, and early in his jazz career he participated on two live album releases with the Norwegian guitarist Thorgeir Stubø.

Andersson has twice been awarded the jazz magazine Orkesterjournalens golden disc for best jazz recording. He has also received numerous awards such as Christer Boustedt's and Börje Fredriksson's scholarships, to name a few.

Despite his success as clarinetist, it was as saxophonist that he gained attention in the late 1970s, when he was active in Umeå and played tenor saxophone with the Umeå Big Band. In the Stockholm area, he was later in the Gugge Hedrenius Band, Uppsala Chamber Soloists and Frösunda Wind Quintet in 1979 before he became a member of Egil "Bop" Johansen's Jazz Incorporated.

Andersson is involved in a large number of jazz projects in the Nordic countries and in Tanglewood, Massachusetts. He leads his Krister Andersson Quartet and often collaborates as guest soloist in other constellations. He is regarded as a brilliant improviser and plays with a modern neo-bop style and is still a sought after classic soloist.

Selected discography

Solo albums 
1986: And Friends (Dragon Records)
1993: About Time (Flash Music)
2002: Catching the Moment (Dragon Records)
2010: Live (Do Music Records)

As sideman 
With Jazz Incorporated
1979:  Cornelis Vreeswijk - Jazz Incorporated (Zarepta Records)
1980: Live At Fasching (Caprice Records)
1982: Walkin' On (Dragon Records), recorded live

With Thorgeir Stubø
1985: Flight (Hot Club Records), live recordings from 1983
1986: Rhythm'a'ning (Cadence Jazz Records), live in Tromsø

With Esko Rosnell Quartet
1988: Malecón (Kompass Records), featuring Krister Andersson

With Bernt Rosengren's Summit Meeting
1993: Bent's Jump (Dragon Records) – live recording at Bent J

With The Ulf Sandberg Quartet
1993: Ulf Sandberg Quartet (Acid Jazz)

With Bosse Broberg
1995: Regni  (Phono Suecia)
2002: Conspiracy in Flat Five (Phono Suecia)

With Georg Riedel
2008: Wolfgang on My Mind (Phono Suecia)

With DUOJ (Cecilia Jonshult - vocals and Lars Jonshult - bass)
2010: Betraktelser (Gason Jazz)

References

External links 
All Of A Sudden Krister Andersson:tenor sax on SoundCloud

1951 births
Living people
Swedish jazz saxophonists
Male saxophonists
Jazz clarinetists
Swedish jazz composers
Male jazz composers
People from Eskilstuna
20th-century Swedish musicians
21st-century Swedish musicians
21st-century saxophonists
21st-century clarinetists
20th-century Swedish male musicians
21st-century Swedish male musicians